Peter Guinness may refer to:
Peter Guinness (actor) (born 1950), British actor and writer
Peter Guinness (writer), British television writer